The Violence is a studio album by British singer and songwriter Darren Hayman featuring backing band the Long Parliament. It was released on 5 November 2012 by Fortuna Pop! The Violence is the third and final part in Hayman's Essex Trilogy.

Critical reception

At Metacritic, which assigns a normalised rating out of 100 to reviews from mainstream critics, the album has an average score of 81 based on 9 reviews, indicating "universal acclaim". Marc Burrows of The Quietus wrote that "these are wonderful pop songs, each a compacted treasure of melody and heart."

Track listing

References

2012 albums
Darren Hayman albums
Fortuna Pop! Records albums